A transmission line may refer to:
 a power transmission line, that conveys electrical energy
 a radio-frequency transmission line, that conveys an information signal